The Asia/Oceania Zone was one of the three zones of the regional Davis Cup competition in 1989.

In the Asia/Oceania Zone there were two different tiers, called groups, in which teams competed against each other to advance to the upper tier.

Group I
Winners in Group I advanced to the World Group Qualifying Round, along with losing teams from the World Group first round. The winner of the preliminary round joined the remaining teams in the main draw first round, while the losing team was relegated to the Asia/Oceania Zone Group II in 1990.

Participating nations

Draw

  relegated to Group II in 1990.

  and  advance to World Group Qualifying Round.

Preliminary round

Philippines vs. Hong Kong

First round

Philippines vs. China

Japan vs. South Korea

Second round

Philippines vs. New Zealand

India vs. South Korea

Group II
The winner in Group II advanced to the Asia/Oceania Zone Group I in 1990.

Participating nations

Draw

  promoted to Group I in 1990.

First round

Bahrain vs. Syria

Sri Lanka vs. Malaysia

Iraq vs. Bangladesh

Jordan vs. Kuwait

Second round

Thailand vs. Bahrain

Sri Lanka vs. Chinese Taipei

Bangladesh vs. Singapore

Kuwait vs. Pakistan

Third round

Thailand vs. Sri Lanka

Pakistan vs. Bangladesh

Fourth round

Pakistan vs. Thailand

References

External links
Davis Cup official website

Davis Cup Asia/Oceania Zone
Asia Oceania Zone